The WestStar Tower (alternatively the WestStar Tower at Hunt Plaza) is a high-rise located at 601 North Mesa Street in Downtown El Paso, Texas. The tower has 20 stories in total. Covering an entire city block, the tower has a ground-level park area, outdoor seating and dining, and about 262,000 square feet (24,300 m²) of Class A+ office space. Alongside this, it also has 13,000 square feet (1,200 m²) of office and retail space on the ground floor. On completion, the building was the first skyscraper above 300 feet built in El Paso for nearly 50 years.

History

2018

June–December 

 On June 20, 2018, Hunt Companies and WestStar announced the groundbreaking of a multi-level, multi-tenant Class A office high-rise skyscraper in Downtown El Paso. The land on which the tower would be built, formerly a parking lot between Mesa Street and Missouri Avenue, was cleared for building. The tower will become the new corporate headquarters for Hunt and WestStar.
 On December 20, 2018, construction went vertical on the tower.

2019

January–February 

 The ground floor of the tower is completed in early February.

2020

January–April 

 In early March, the estimated completion date of the tower was moved to winter 2020. This date was further changed to early 2021.

May 

 On May 21, the last steel beam was placed on the tower.

Tenants 

 Corralito Steakhouse The first restaurant tenant to occupy space in the building will be Corralito Steakhouse, a local restaurant, occupying 4,000 of the about 13,000 square feet of retail space on the ground floor. Corralito has multiple other locations in El Paso and Ciudad Juárez.
 Hunt Companies (corporate headquarters)Hunt will move its corporate headquarters to the new WestStar Tower. The Hunt Family Foundation will also be located in the tower.
WestStar (corporate headquarters)WestStar, the building's namesake, will operate a full service banking facility at the tower. The tower will also become the corporate headquarters for the company. WestStar is a local banking company that operates in Ciudad Juárez, Las Cruces, and El Paso.

See also 
 List of tallest buildings in El Paso

References

External links 
 Official website of WestStar Tower
 WestStar Tower portfolio by Duda|Paine
 Official website of Hunt Companies
 Live construction feed of WestStar Tower

Office buildings completed in 2020
Buildings and structures in El Paso, Texas